Dulce familia is a 2019 Mexican comedy film directed by Nicolás López. The film premiered on 10 May 2019, and is stars Fernanda Castillo, and Vadhir Derbez. The plot revolves around Tamy (Castillo), a woman who faces her overweight when she is about to get married, because she wants to wear the same wedding dress as her mother, Verónica (Florinda Meza), a famous telenovela actress obsessed with her physical image and which due to its age has been relegated on television.

Plot 
Dulce familia is a comedy about five women of different generations and their respective fears, eating disorders, diets and sugar addiction. Tamy (Fernanda Castillo) will undergo all unimaginable tortures to lose 10 kilos in two months and be able to use the wedding dress her mother used. In this impossible mission, Tamy will be accompanied by her sisters Bárbara (Regina Blandón) and Ale (Paz Bascuñán) and her bitter mother Verónica (Florinda Meza) who make up this family.

Cast 
 Fernanda Castillo as Tamy
 Vadhir Derbez as Beto
 Florinda Meza as Verónica
 Regina Blandón as Bárbara
 Paz Bascuñán as Ale
 Luciano Cruz-Coke as Director Canal
 Roberto Flores as Sacerdote
 Boris Quercia as Carlos
 Ariel Levy as Presentador
 Mirella Granucci as Melina

References

External links 
 

Mexican comedy films
2010s Mexican films